Thaker (Gujarati: ठाकर), is a family name referring to the descendants of Kashiraj Thakar, an 11th-century Kashmiri Brahmin who moved to the region of Saurashtra, Gujarat to spread and maintain Hinduism on the request of the Jayasimha Siddharaja (b. 1094), a Hindu Chaulukya king who ruled modern-day Gujarat until 1143. The family rose to prominence within Saurashtran nobility throughout the 12th-19th centuries as Diwans.

History
During the late 11th and early 12th centuries, Gujarat suffered severe violence between the Hindu forces and Muslim invaders. In this time, Brahmins who were tasked with upholding Hindu culture and teachings were often the victims of genocide. As a result, Brahmins from around India were invited to visit, and later settle in Gujarat to maintain Hinduism in the region. Kashiraj Thaker arrived in Saurashtra in the 12th century from Kashmir upon the request of Jayasimha Siddharaja, a Chaulukya king who ascended to the throne of Patan in 1096 at the age of 2, and ruled modern-day Gujarat till 1143. His descendants continued as members of the inner-circle of the Solanki dynasty till the dynasty's fall in 1244. Muslim rule began in Gujarat in 1297 with the victory of Ala-ud-din Khalji over Karandev II; the last Hindu ruler of Gujarat. Before 1298, Muslim people had only had occasional contact with this part of India, but, with the rise of the Delhi Sultanate in Gujarat it was not till the 14th century that the Thaker family members once again took prominent positions as chief advisor to the rulers in Saurashtra and Patan; maintaining prominence as landowners and financiers. Gujarat remained under the Delhi Sultanate till 1573 when Emperor Akbar annexed Gujarat; becoming a Mughal Subah. Mughal rule lasted some 185 years till 1758 when Momin Khan surrendered to the Maratha Empire.

In the 18th century, the Peshwas had established their sovereignty over Gujarat including Saurashtra and had successfully held the British at bay. They collected taxes and tributes through their representatives. Thaker family members were active as Treasurers to the Peshwa Prime Ministers. Damaji Rao Gaekwad and Kadam Bande divided the Peshwa's territory between them, with Damaji establishing the sway of Gaekwad over Gujarat and making Barodara his capital; A branch of the Thaker family also settled in Baroda and has remained there to this day. While the Marathas had thus far kept the British from power, the ensuing internecine war among them was fully exploited by the British, who interfered in the affairs of both Gaekwads and the Peshwas to their advantage.

Despite the paramountcy of the British Raj, the princely states were still ruled individually by heirs of the Maratha Empire and other clans. As such the members of the Thaker family continued in their lifetime hereditary positions as treasurers, financiers and political advisors to the various Maharajas or Maharanas. 

In the 14th - 19th centuries other branches of the Thaker family became landowners, owning a significant portion of land in and around what is today Wadhwan City and other regions of Saurashtra. Post-independence, laws were passed stating that in the interests of distribution of wealth and social equality, ownership of farmland would transfer from large landlords to the farmers who worked the land itself. As a result, many landlords including branches of the Thaker family lost vast quantities of wealth overnight.

With the partition of India in 1947, the princely states of India, which had been left by the Indian Independence Act 1947 to choose whether to accede to India or Pakistan or to remain outside of them, were all incorporated into one or other of the new dominions. Gujarat, with its proximity to the partition line between Pakistan and India suffered massive violence between its Hindu and Muslim populations, and as a result some Gujaratis who had settled across the border, including members of the Thaker family, fled abroad; primarily to East Africa, the United Kingdom and the United States. A large branch of the Thaker family however, still resides in Gujarat and other parts of India to this day.

See also

 List of Indian princely states: for a list of Indian princely states at the time of Indian Independence.

References

Surnames